This list comprises all players who have scored at least one competitive goal (MLS, Playoffs, US Open Cup, CONCACAF Champions League) for the New York Red Bulls (formerly known as the MetroStars) since the team's first Major League Soccer season in 1996. Players who were on the roster but never scored a goal are not listed.

Goalscorers
As of March 18, 2023(All competitive matches):
Statistics from Major League Soccer and Metro Fanatic

Bold signifies current Red Bulls player

Goals by Nation
As of March 18, 2023 (All competitive matches)

References

Goal